Labidochirus is a genus of hermit crabs, containing the following two species:

Labidochirus anomalus (Balss, 1913)
Labidochirus splendescens (Owen, 1839)

References

Hermit crabs
Decapod genera